The Chinese Ambassador to Malawi  is the official representative of the People's Republic of China to the Republic of Malawi.

List of representatives

See also
Ambassadors of the People's Republic of China

References

Ambassadors of China to Malawi
China
Malawi